Throughout Indonesian history, the title of First Lady or, in an instance, First Gentleman has been used to refer to the wife or husband of the president of Indonesia. While the Constitution of Indonesia does not mention anything about the spouses of the president, it continues to hold significant influence in the Indonesian society.

The current holder of the title is Iriana Joko Widodo, wife of current president Joko Widodo. Taufiq Kiemas, husband of President Megawati Sukarnoputri, to date is the only first gentleman.

History 
It is unclear when the role of Ibu Negara first developed in the Indonesian constitutional conventions. Sukarno, the first president, was married to his third wife Fatmawati when he became president in August 1945. Sukarno then married Hartini in July 1953 on Fatmawati's permission. Hartini lived in Istana Bogor and also accompanied the president to official state duties and visit abroad. Throughout his presidency, Sukarno married another five women, but Fatmawati remained the first lady.

Siti Hartinah, Soeharto's wife, occupied the role of Ibu Negara until her death in April 1996. Her eldest daughter, Siti Hardiyanti Rukmana ("Tutut") acted on behalf of her mother throughout the remainder of her father's presidency until 1998. From March to May 1998, she also served as the minister of social affairs.

List of title holders

References

See also
 List of presidents of Indonesia
 Second spouses of Indonesia
 List of vice presidents of Indonesia
 Prime Minister of Indonesia

Spouses of Presidents of Indonesia
 
Indonesia